Ersu may refer to:

People
 Ersu Şaşma (born 1999), Turkish pole vaulter
 Erten Ersu (born 1994), Turkish football player
 Kerem Ersü (born 1967), Turkish archer

Other
 Ersu language